Jermaine Coleman (born 17 June 1982) is a rugby league coach who is the lead coach of Jamaica and a former Jamaican international rugby league footballer who played as a  or  for a number of clubs.

Background
Coleman was born in Leeds, West Yorkshire, England and is Jamaican heritage.

His brother Jy-mel Coleman is a fellow Jamaican international.

He is a teacher.

Playing career

Club career
Coleman played for the Hunslet Hawks between 2001 and 2002.

He played for the Gateshead Thunder in 2002.

Coleman played for the York City Knights in 2003.

He played for the Gateshead Thunder in 2003.

Coleman played for the London Skolars between 2004 and 2011.

He played for the Hemel Stags as a player-coach between 2013 and 2015.

Coleman re-joined the London Skolars, this time as a player-coach in 2015, before ending his playing career in 2021.

International career
Coleman represented the Academic Lions in 2003.

He earned his one and only test cap for Jamaica in 2017 against France.

Coaching career

Club career
Coleman took the head coach role at the London Skolars in 2019, and performed the same roles in 2020 and 2021

He took over at the London Broncos in the Betfred Championship following their move to Plough Lane ahead of their 2022 season. He was sacked in May 2022 following poor performances and results.

International career
Coleman coached Jamaica for two games in 2016, beating Ireland in Dublin and drawing with Wales.

He is the main coach for Jamaica under Director of Rugby Romeo Monteith at the 2021 Rugby League World Cup.

References

External links
London Broncos profile

1982 births
Living people
English rugby league players
Hemel Stags players
Hunslet R.L.F.C. players
Jamaica national rugby league team coaches
Jamaica national rugby league team players
London Broncos coaches
London Skolars coaches
London Skolars players
Newcastle Thunder players
Rugby league halfbacks
Rugby league five-eighths
Rugby league players from Leeds
York City Knights players